The 2017 America East women's basketball tournament was the postseason women's basketball tournament for the America East Conference. It was held March 4 through 10, 2017. The quarterfinals and semifinals were held at Cross Insurance Arena in Portland, ME, with the finals being held at the SEFCU Arena in Albany, NY. Albany won their 6th straight American East tournament title to earn an automatic bid to the 2017 NCAA tournament.

Seeds
Teams were seeded by record within the conference, with a tiebreaker system to seed teams with identical conference records.

Schedule
All tournament games are nationally televised on an ESPN network:

Bracket and Results

All times listed are Eastern

External links
 2017 America East Women's Basketball Championship

See also
 2017 America East men's basketball tournament

References

Tournament
America East Conference women's basketball tournament